José María Montoya may refer to:

 José María Montoya Duque (1757–1834): Colombian army colonel and politician; governor of Antioquia.
 José María Montoya Valenzuela (1897–1977): Colombian architect.
 José María Montoya (diplomat): Mexican diplomat.